McKenzie College is a private college in Moncton, New Brunswick, Canada. McKenzie College offers programs in Art and Design, Social Entrepreneurship and IT. The college also includes the McKenzie Language Centre.



History
Since opening in 1988, McKenzie College has undergone several restructures of its multiple locations throughout Atlantic Canada before relocating to Moncton in 1997. The college has recently expanded to offer programs in information technology and English language training.

Programs
•Visual Arts Foundation

•Graphic Design

•Photography Media Arts

•Video Game Art

•TV & Game Animation

•Social Entrepreneurship

•Software Testing

•English language training classes

•Social Media Marketing Strategies

References

Colleges in New Brunswick